Guararé   is a town and corregimiento in Guararé District, Los Santos Province, Panama with a population of 4524 as of 2010. It is the seat of Guararé District. Its population as of 1990 was 3329, its population as of 2000 was 3,883. It is also recognized by its annual festival of La Mejorana.

References

Corregimientos of Los Santos Province
Populated places in Los Santos Province